George Rodrigue is a Pulitzer Prize winning journalist who was the editor-in-chief of The Plain Dealer in Cleveland, Ohio from 2015 to 2020.

References 

Pulitzer Prize winners for journalism
Living people
Year of birth missing (living people)
Editors of Ohio newspapers
American journalists